Hubert Vo (born 30 May 1956) is a Democratic member of the Texas House of Representatives for House District 149. He is the first and only Vietnamese American to be elected to the Texas legislature.

Personal life
Vo was born in South Vietnam and left for the United States in 1975.

Vo is a 1983 graduate of the University of Houston with a Bachelor of Science in Mechanical Engineering degree. He is married and has three children.

Political career
Vo currently serves as a Democratic member of the Texas House of Representatives, representing the 149th District which contains part of Harris County including part of west Houston and the suburbs of Alief and Katy. Vo was elected in 2004, defeating the incumbent Republican, Talmadge Heflin by the razor-thin margin of 20,695 to 20,662.

Talmadge Heflin was the Republican nominee again in 2006, seeking a rematch with Hubert Vo in the election of Tuesday, November 7, 2006. Vo won re-election with 54% of the vote.

The Houston Chronicle has reported numerous stories about apartment complexes owned by Vo. The complexes have been cited by the City of Houston for various building code violations.

In the 2008 Presidential election primaries Vo initially endorsed Senator Hillary Clinton, but later spoke for Texas Asian Americans & Pacific Islanders for Obama.

He won re-election in the 2010 election.

In 2014, Hubert Vo endorsed a program that would allow food stamps to be used at restaurants such as Taste of Texas and Luby's.

In 2016, Vo won re-nomination in the Democratic primary against challenger Demetria Smith, 4,442 votes (64.9%) to 2,406 (35.1%).

Current legislative committees
Hubert Vo has been a member of the following committees:
Economic and Small Business Development, Vice Chair
House Administration, Member
Insurance, Member
Public Safety, Member

References

External links
 Campaign website of Hubert Vo
 

1956 births
Living people
21st-century American politicians
American politicians of Vietnamese descent
Democratic Party members of the Texas House of Representatives
University of Houston alumni
Vietnamese emigrants to the United States
Asian-American people in Texas politics